José González Morfin (born 25 July 1954) was a Mexican politician and lawyer affiliated with the PAN. He served as Deputy of the LXII Legislature of the Mexican Congress representing Michoacán. He also served as Senator during the LX and LXI Legislatures.

References

1954 births
Living people
Politicians from Michoacán
20th-century Mexican lawyers
Members of the Senate of the Republic (Mexico)
Members of the Chamber of Deputies (Mexico)
Presidents of the Chamber of Deputies (Mexico)
National Action Party (Mexico) politicians
People from Cotija de la Paz
21st-century Mexican politicians